Political ponerology is a concept popularized by Polish psychiatrist Andrzej Łobaczewski. Łobaczewski advocated using the fields of psychology, sociology, philosophy, and history to account for such phenomena as aggressive war, ethnic cleansing, genocide, and despotism.

Andrzej Łobaczewski and early research group

During World War II, Łobaczewski worked for the Polish Home Army, an underground Polish resistance organization. After the war, he studied at Jagiellonian University under professor of psychiatry Edward Brzezicki. Łobaczewski's class was the last to receive an education uninfluenced by Soviet ideology and censorship, after which psychiatry was restricted to Pavlovian concepts. The study of genetics and psychopathy was forbidden.

See also
Antisocial personality disorder

References and notes

Majority–minority relations
Political theories
Psychopathology
Sociological terminology